Liza! Liza! is the debut studio album by American singer Liza Minnelli. It was released on October 12, 1964, by Capitol Records. The album contains her interpretations of twelve pop standards. It was recorded in June 1964 at Capitol Records' New York studio at 151 West 46th Street.

The album was re-released in 1988 by Capitol as Maybe This Time – Liza Minnelli Sings the Sensational Hit from the Film "Cabaret".

Album information
When Liza Minnelli recorded this album she was just a teenager. At seventeen she had starred in the Off-Broadway revival of Best Foot Forward in 1963. The publicity surrounding her abilities led to television appearances and a single on the Cadence Records label. This single, "You Are for Loving", a song she performed in the show, reportedly sold half a million copies. On the strength of this, Capitol signed the singer and slowly began issuing several singles targeted to Minnelli's age group and later committed to a whole album. These singles were recorded over the summer of 1963 in New York and by reviewing this output it is clear the artistry displayed by Minnelli was not that of a regular teenager.

For the creation of her debut album, she turned to her friend and classmate Marvin Hamlisch, who could help her in choosing the tunes. At the time he was working in the Broadway production of Funny Girl. Two of the songs featured on the album, "It's Just a Matter of Time" and "The Travelin' Life", were cut by Minnelli with Hamlisch on piano 2 years earlier as a gift to her mother. Another one of the tracks featured here, "If I Were in Your Shoes", was written by the young writers Fred Ebb and John Kander, who had yet to make a big impact on the stage. It was the start of a decade-long collaboration during which the trio delivered several unforgettable hits.

Peter Matz, who was also working with Barbra Streisand at the time, and would keep on collaborating with Minnelli up until his death, was mainly responsible for the rich and lush orchestral treatment given to the whole project.

Reception

Liza! Liza! peaked on the Billboard 200 chart at number 115. It debuted there on November 21, 1964 and remained in the chart for 8 weeks. Over a period of 3 years it reportedly sold over half a million copies. It received several glowing reviews, with Cashbox feeling it was "an auspicious debut" showcasing "fine new talent", while Record World said it was an "impressive [, ...] beguiling [,... and] beautifully varied" album from a "major singing talent". Billboard called it "simply great [... with] clarity of tone, genuine feeling, emotion".

Track listing

Side one
"It's Just a Matter of Time" (Richard Everitt, Laurence Stith)
"If I Were in Your Shoes" (John Kander, Fred Ebb)
"Meantime" (Al Stillman, Robert Allen)
"Try to Remember" (Harvey Schmidt, Tom Jones)
"I'm All I've Got" (Milton Schafer, Ronny Graham)
"Maybe Soon" (Richard Everitt, Laurence Stith)

Side two
"Maybe This Time" (John Kander, Fred Ebb)
"Don't Ever Leave Me" (Jerome Kern, Oscar Hammerstein II)
"The Travelin' Life" (Howard Liebling, Marvin Hamlisch)
"Together (Wherever We Go)" (Stephen Sondheim, Jule Styne)
"Blue Moon" (Richard Rodgers, Lorenz Hart)
"I Knew Him When" (Harold Arlen, E.Y. "Yip" Harburg, Ira Gershwin)

Personnel
Producer: Si Rady
Orchestra arranged and conducted by Peter Matz
Sherman Weisburd - front cover photography

Charts

References

Liza Minnelli: When It Comes Down to It.......1968–1977 liner notes by Glenn A. Baker, 2003
Liza Minnelli: The Complete A&M Recordings liner notes by Scott Schechter, 2008
Liza Minnelli: The Complete Capitol Collection liner notes by Scott Schechter, 2006

Liza Minnelli albums
1964 debut albums
Capitol Records albums
Albums arranged by Peter Matz
Albums conducted by Peter Matz